Cinema Choopistha Mava  is a 2015 Telugu-language romantic comedy film written and directed by Trinadha Rao Nakkina. The film stars Raj Tarun, Avika Gor, and Rao Ramesh. The title of the film is based on a song from Race Gurram (2014). The film is remade in Bengali as Girlfriend (2018) and Rangeela Rayabaa in Marathi

Cast

Raj Tarun as Kaththi
Avika Gor as Parineeta Chatterjee
Rao Ramesh as Somnath Chatterjee, Parineeta's father
Brahmanandam as Daya
Saptagiri as Rakhi Pandaga
Praveen as Rahul
 Satya as Bus conductor
 Ram Prasad as Kaththi's friend
 Lakshmi
Abhay Bethiganti as Kaththi's friend
Shankar Melkote as College Principal
Posani Krishna Murali as Doctor
Krishna Bhagawan as Parineeta's relative
Chelaki Chanti as Parineeta's relative
Thagubothu Ramesh in an appearance in the song "Mama O"
Satyam Rajesh as passenger on Kaththi's auto
Sudigali Sudheer as College student
Seenu as College student
Mehaboob Basha as Rowdy on bus

Soundtrack 
Music composed by shekar chandra.

Release 
The Hindu wrote that "In the initial portions, the film shows a supposedly comic sequence in which students enact a skit that’s a mix of Ramayana and Mahabharata with a new message. It’s just a glimpse of how frustrating the film can get. And it gets worse by and by".

Notes

References

2010s Telugu-language films
Telugu films remade in other languages
Films directed by Trinadha Rao Nakkina